The British Dragonfly Society is a conservation organisation in the United Kingdom. It was founded in 1983 and its aims are to promote and to encourage the study and conservation of dragonflies and damselflies and their natural habitats, especially in the United Kingdom.

The Society runs the Dragonfly Recording Network (DRN) to collect Odonata records in the UK. It also promotes a range of research and conservation projects.

The British Dragonfly Society is a registered charity, number 800196.

See also
Odonata
List of British dragonflies

References

External links

Worldwide Dragonfly Association
Dragonflies and damselflies (Odonata Information Network)

Charities based in England
Royal Borough of Kensington and Chelsea
1983 establishments in the United Kingdom